is a  marine national park located in Nagasaki prefecture of northwest Kyūshū, Japan.  It consists of the coastal regions of Matsuura Peninsula, extending northward from the port city of Sasebo and encompasses the Kujūku Islands, with over 200 islands to the west, Hirado Peninsula further west, and the coastlines of the Gotō Islands to the far west.

History
Efforts to create Saikai National Park began in 1949, at the initiative of then-Sasebo mayor Masasuke Nagata. The area encompassing the present park mostly fell within the territory of the former Sasebo Naval District of the Imperial Japanese Navy, and was regarded as a strategic zone in which photography was strictly prohibited, and visitation by outsiders was discouraged. After the surrender of Japan and dissolution of the Japanese military, Mayor Nagata saw the possibilities of tourism to boost the local economy, and petitioned the Diet of Japan, aided by studies made by Tokyo University, Kyoto University, Nagasaki University and a promotional campaign made by Mainichi Shimbun newspaper.

The campaign was ultimately successful, and Sakai National Park was established on March 16, 1955. It was the 18th national park to be created in Japan.

Geography and geology
This park consists of more than 400 islands, large and small, including Hirado, the Kujukushima Islands, and the Gotō Islands. Hirado retains the historic sites of its erstwhile port for foreign trade. The Gotō Islands have interesting inlets and high cliffs as well as rare volcanic formations.

Wildlife and ecology
The park is valued for its scenic beauty and as an ecological support for the rich fishing grounds in the area. The mild climate and warm currents result in semi-tropical vegetation, including tree ferns.

See also
List of national parks of Japan
 Kitamatsuura Peninsula
 Mount Yasumandake

References
Southerland, Mary and Britton, Dorothy. The National Parks of Japan. Kodansha International (1995).

Notes

External links
UNEP-WCMC data sheet
https://web.archive.org/web/20051128073556/http://www.biodic.go.jp/english/jpark/np/saikai_e.html

Parks and gardens in Nagasaki Prefecture
National parks of Japan
Protected areas established in 1955
1955 establishments in Japan